Brian Frederick Lundberg (born June 5, 1960) is a Canadian retired ice hockey player who played one game in the National Hockey League for the Pittsburgh Penguins during the 1982–83 season.

Playing career
Lundberg was born in Burnaby, British Columbia and raised in Lake Cowichan, British Columbia. Lundberg played one game for the WCHL's Seattle Breakers in 1977–78 then opted to join the University of Michigan the next season. He spent four years with the Wolverines and was taken 177th overall by the Pittsburgh Penguins in the 1980. Following his senior year in 1981–82 he saw his first action as a pro when he played a few late season games with the American Hockey League's Erie Blades. Lundberg played a game for the Penguins in 1982–83, on February 21, 1983 against the Toronto Maple Leafs, but spent most of the schedule with the Baltimore Skipjacks of the AHL. He retired in 1984 after splitting his time between the Skipjacks and the IHL's Muskegon Mohawks.

Personal life
Lundberg was raised in the small town Lake Cowichan, British Columbia. He currently resides in Honeymoon Bay, British Columbia, and is married with two daughters. In May 2014 he was inducted into the Cowichan Lake Heritage Sports Wall of Fame. He is currently a scout for the Brandon Wheat Kings of the Western Hockey League.

Career statistics

Regular season and playoffs

See also
 List of players who played only one game in the NHL

References

External links
 

1960 births
Living people
Baltimore Skipjacks players
Canadian ice hockey defencemen
Canadian people of Swedish descent
Erie Blades players
Ice hockey people from British Columbia
Michigan Wolverines men's ice hockey players
Muskegon Mohawks players
Pittsburgh Penguins draft picks
Pittsburgh Penguins players
Seattle Breakers players
Sportspeople from Burnaby